Carlos Añez (born 6 July 1995) is a Bolivian professional footballer who plays for Royal Pari F.C. in the Bolivian Primera División.

Career
Añez joined C.D. Jorge Wilstermann ahead of the 2021 season.

International career
On 28 May 2018 Añez started for the Bolivia national football team against the United States national team in Pennsylvania in a friendly.

References

External links
 

1995 births
Living people
Bolivian footballers
Bolivia international footballers
Association football midfielders
Oriente Petrolero players
Bolivia youth international footballers
The Strongest players
Bolivian Primera División players